Big River is an abandoned mining town in the Buller District of New Zealand. It can he reached on foot, by mountain bike or along an old dray road by 4WD. It is located between Reefton and Waiuta on the Big River.

References

Buller District
Ghost towns in the West Coast, New Zealand